Peter John Branscombe (7 December 1929 in Sittingbourne, Kent – 31 December 2008 in St Andrews, Scotland) was an English academic in German studies, a musicologist, and a writer on Austrian cultural history.

Career 
Branscombe attended Dulwich College where he showed talent as cricket player. Having served his military service in Vienna, Austria, he studied literature at Worcester College, Oxford. There, he became acquainted with notable Austrian émigrés such as the composer Egon Wellesz and the musicologist Otto Erich Deutsch.

In 1959 Branscombe joined the University of St Andrews' faculty of German Studies, a post he kept until the end of his life. In 1979, he founded St Andrews' Institute for Austrian Studies, the only such research facility in the United Kingdom.

His interests included the popular theatre of the Biedermeier and the Viennese suburban theatre with authors like Raimund and Nestroy. He wrote works on Joseph Haydn, Mozart and Schubert. Over many years, he wrote reviews of concerts and recordings and contributed to The Grove Dictionary of Music and Musicians and the Wagner-Handbuch (Wagner Handbook) where he researched many forgotten composers of the 19th century. Branscombe also translated poems by Heinrich Heine and academic texts.

Between 1996 and 2001, Branscombe edited six Possen for the historical-critical edition of Nestroy's complete works.

He was married to German studies academic Marina Branscombe and they had three children.

Selected works
 Unpublished dissertation in two volumes: The connexions between drama and music in the Viennese popular theatre from the opening of the Leopoldstädter Theater (1781) to Nestroy's opera parodies (ca 1855), with special reference to the forms of parody, 1976, Wiener Stadtbibliothek
 Heinrich Heine – Selected Verse by Heine. Translated by Peter Branscombe. Penguin Books. 1967/1968.
 Austrian Life and Literature, 1780–1938. Eight essays. Scottish Academic Press 1978.
 Schubert Studies. Problems of Style and Chronology. (with Eva Badura-Skoda) Cambridge 1978, 
 W. A. Mozart: Die Zauberflöte. Cambridge Opera Handbooks. Cambridge 1991, 
 Numerous contributions and reviews in: Forum for Modern Language Studies, Austrian Studies, Nestroyana

References

External links
Translated Penguin Book - at  Penguin First Editions reference site of early first edition Penguin Books.

1929 births
2008 deaths
People from Sittingbourne
People educated at Dulwich College
Alumni of Worcester College, Oxford
Academics of the University of St Andrews
English philologists
English writers about music
Germanists
English musicologists
Theatrologists
20th-century British musicologists